Colin Chin (born August 28, 1961) is a retired American professional ice hockey player.

Chin played 11 seasons of professional hockey, including 10 seasons and 660 games with his hometown club the Fort Wayne Komets of the International Hockey League (IHL). He and helped the Komets capture the 1992–93 Turner Cup, and also served as a player coach for the Komets during the 1994–95 IHL season.

On November 17, 2007, Chin was inducted into the Komet Hall of Fame. His jersey number #26 was retired on November 17, 2007.

Career statistics

Awards and honors

References

External links

1961 births
American men's ice hockey centers
Baltimore Skipjacks players
Fort Wayne Komets players
Ice hockey players from Indiana
Living people
Sportspeople from Fort Wayne, Indiana
UIC Flames men's ice hockey players
Ice hockey coaches from Indiana